Florian Planker (born 8 February 1977) is an Italian former para-alpine skier and current ice sledge hockey player. He is a five time Paralympian who was named a flag-bearer in 2017.

References

External links 
 

1977 births
Alpine skiers at the 2002 Winter Paralympics
Italian sledge hockey players
Living people
Medalists at the 2002 Winter Paralympics
Paralympic bronze medalists for Italy
Paralympic sledge hockey players of Italy
Sportspeople from Bolzano
Paralympic medalists in alpine skiing
Paralympic alpine skiers of Italy